Bratland is a surname. Notable people with the surname include:

Brita Bratland (1910–1975), Norwegian folk singer
Erlend Bratland (born 1991), Norwegian singer
Geir Bratland (born 1970), Norwegian keyboardist
Ingebjørg Bratland (born 1990), Norwegian folk singer, kveder and artist
Per Bratland (1907–1988), Norwegian newspaper editor
Sondre Bratland (born 1938), Norwegian folk singer, song teacher and Government scholar
Sverre Bratland (1917–2002), Norwegian military leader